Route 66 State Park is a public recreation area located on the Meramec River at the site of the former town of Times Beach, Missouri.

History

Times Beach was bought, dismantled, and decontaminated by the United States Environmental Protection Agency following the discovery of widespread dioxin contamination in the 1980s. Fields of wild grass and brush now grow where the homes of evacuated residents formerly stood. Deserted streets line the park and hint at what once was a community in west Saint Louis County.

Route 66 bridge
The visitor center, located in the old Bridgehead Inn on the east side of the Meramec River, was joined to the park on the west side by the old Route 66 bridge, which has been closed due to safety concerns. The park itself is accessible only from east-bound Interstate 44 at exit 265. The visitor center is accessed from either direction at exit 266 and is cut off from the park it serves.

Activities and amenities
The park has a boat ramp providing access to the river as well as a picnic area and trails for hiking, cycling, and equestrian use. The visitor center exhibits photos and memorabilia of structures along Route 66 in the Saint Louis area which have been torn down and replaced by modern shopping centers and strip malls. Displays include the first historic Route 66 marker, originally erected on the highway in Springfield, Missouri, as well as an interpretation of the ecological disaster and 20-year cleanup of the area.

References

External links

Route 66 State Park Missouri Department of Natural Resources 
Route 66 State Park Map Missouri Department of Natural Resources

State parks of Missouri
Protected areas of St. Louis County, Missouri
U.S. Route 66 in Missouri
Protected areas established in 1997
1997 establishments in Missouri